The Zetter Hotel is a hotel in London, located at 86-88 Clerkenwell Road in Clerkenwell, London.

The hotel is owned by The Zetter Group, itself owned by investors Mark Sainsbury (son of John Sainsbury, Baron Sainsbury of Preston Candover), Michael Benyan, and Jason Catifeoglou.

References

External links

 

Hotels in London
Buildings and structures in Clerkenwell